Monteodorisio (Abruzzese:) is a comune (municipality) and town in the province of Chieti, in the region of Abruzzo, in central Italy.

It is home to a 13th-century castle.
It is a small town between Vasto and the Abruzzo Mountains.

References

 
Cities and towns in Abruzzo